Glyptothorax is a genus of catfishes order Siluriformes of the family Sisoridae. It is the most species-rich and widely distributed genus in the family with new species being discovered on a regular basis. These species are distributed in the Black Sea basin, northern Turkey, south and east to the Yangtze River drainage in China and south throughout Indo-China to Java, Indonesia. They are found in Asia Minor (in the Tigris and Euphrates River drainages)  and southwards to Southeast Asia. The genus is very diverse in the Indian subcontinent. Southeast Asian species tend to have restricted distributions.

Description
This genus is easily distinguished from other sisorids by having an adhesive apparatus on the thorax with grooves parallel or oblique to the longitudinal axis of the body, as opposed to grooves transverse to the longitudinal axis of body or the thoracic adhesive apparatus entirely absent. The dorsal fin and pectoral fins have strong spines. The dorsal fin spine is smooth or serrate on the front edge and smooth or finely serrated on the posterior edge. The pectoral fin spine is serrated on the front edge. The head is small and depressed and the snout is conical. The body is elongate, from moderately to greatly depressed. The skin is either smooth or tuberculate. The eyes are small and dorsally placed. The lips are thick, fleshy and often papillate. The maxillary barbels have a well-developed membrane and a soft base. The gill openings are wide. The paired fins are plaited and modified to form an adhesive apparatus in some species of Glyptothorax.

Ecology
Like other sisorids, these fish are rheophilic, that is they inhabit fast-flowing streams, where they are adapted to live by using the adhesive apparatus on the underside to attach themselves to rocks and prevent being washed away.

Species
There are currently 104 recognized species in this genus:
 Glyptothorax alaknandi Tilak, 1969
 Glyptothorax alidaeii Mousavi-Sabet, Eagderi, Vatandoust and Freyhof, 2021
 Glyptothorax anamalaiensis Silas, 1952
 Glyptothorax annandalei Hora, 1923
 Glyptothorax armeniacus (L. S. Berg, 1918) (Armenian mountain catfish)
 Glyptothorax ater Anganthoibi & Vishwanath, 2011
 Glyptothorax botius (F. Hamilton, 1822)
 Glyptothorax buchanani H. M. Smith, 1945
 Glyptothorax burmanicus Prashad & Mukerji, 1929
 Glyptothorax callopterus H. M. Smith, 1945
 Glyptothorax caudimaculatus Anganthoibi & Vishwanath, 2011
 Glyptothorax cavia (F. Hamilton, 1822)
 Glyptothorax chimtuipuiensis Anganthoibi & Vishwanath, 2010
 Glyptothorax chindwinica Vishwanath & Linthoingambi, 2007
 Glyptothorax churamanii Rameshori & Vishwanath, 2012 
 Glyptothorax clavatus Rameshori & Vishwanath, 2014 
 Glyptothorax conirostris (Steindachner, 1867)
 Glyptothorax coracinus H. H. Ng & Rainboth, 2008 
 Glyptothorax cous (Linnaeus, 1766)
 Glyptothorax cyanochloros (Bleeker, 1847) 
 Glyptothorax davissinghi Manimekalan & H. S. Das, 1998
 Glyptothorax deqinensis T. P. Mo & X. L. Chu, 1986
 Glyptothorax dikrongensis Tamang & Chaudhry, 2011
 Glyptothorax dorsalis Vinciguerra, 1890
 Glyptothorax elankadensis Plamoottil & Abraham, 2013 (Travancore rock catfish) 
 Glyptothorax exodon H. H. Ng & Rachmatika, 2005 
 Glyptothorax filicatus H. H. Ng & Freyhof, 2008
 Glyptothorax fokiensis (Rendahl (de), 1925)
 Glyptothorax fucatus W. S. Jiang, H. H. Ng, J. X. Yang & X. Y. Chen, 2012 
 Glyptothorax fuscus Fowler, 1934
 Glyptothorax garhwali Tilak, 1969
 Glyptothorax gracilis (Günther, 1864)
 Glyptothorax granosus W. S. Jiang, H. H. Ng, J. X. Yang & X. Y. Chen, 2012 
 Glyptothorax granulus Vishwanath & Linthoingambi, 2007
 Glyptothorax hainanensis (Nichols & C. H. Pope, 1927)
 Glyptothorax honghensis S. S. Li, 1984
 Glyptothorax horai (Fowler, 1934)
 Glyptothorax housei Herre, 1942
 Glyptothorax igniculus H. H. Ng & S. O. Kullander, 2013 
 Glyptothorax indicus Talwar, 1991
 Glyptothorax interspinalus (Đ. Y. Mai, 1978)
 Glyptothorax jalalensis Balon (pl) & K. Hensel, 1970
 Glyptothorax jayarami Rameshori & Vishwanath, 2012 
 Glyptothorax kashmirensis Hora, 1923
 Glyptothorax ketambe H. H. Ng & Hadiaty, 2009
 Glyptothorax kudremukhensis K. C. Gopi, 2007
 Glyptothorax kurdistanicus (L. S. Berg, 1931)
 Glyptothorax laak (Popta, 1904)
 Glyptothorax lampris Fowler, 1934
 Glyptothorax lanceatus H. H. Ng, W. S. Jiang & X. Y. Chen, 2012 
 Glyptothorax laosensis Fowler, 1934
 Glyptothorax lonah (Sykes, 1839)
 Glyptothorax longicauda S. S. Li, 1984
 Glyptothorax longinema S. S. Li, 1984
 Glyptothorax longjiangensis T. P. Mo & X. L. Chu, 1986
 Glyptothorax maceriatus H. H. Ng & Lalramliana, 2012 
 Glyptothorax macromaculatus S. S. Li, 1984
 Glyptothorax madraspatanus (F. Day, 1873)
 Glyptothorax major (Boulenger, 1894)
 Glyptothorax malabarensis K. C. Gopi, 2010
 Glyptothorax manipurensis Menon, 1955
 Glyptothorax mibangi Darshan, Dutta, Kachari, Gogoi & D. N. Das, 2015 
 Glyptothorax minimaculatus S. S. Li, 1984
 Glyptothorax naziri Mirza & I. U. Naik, 1969
 Glyptothorax nelsoni Ganguly, N. C. Datta & S. Sen, 1972
 Glyptothorax ngapang Vishwanath & Linthoingambi, 2007
 Glyptothorax nieuwenhuisi (Vaillant, 1902)
 Glyptothorax obliquimaculatus W. S. Jiang, X. Y. Chen & J. X. Yang, 2010
 Glyptothorax pallozonus (S. Y. Lin, 1934)
 Glyptothorax panda Ferraris & Britz, 2005
 Glyptothorax pantherinus Anganthoibi & Vishwanath, 2013 
 Glyptothorax pasighatensis Arunkumar, 2016 
 Glyptothorax pectinopterus (McClelland, 1842)
 Glyptothorax pedunculatus Roberts, 2021<ref name=Roberts2021>Roberts, T.R. (2021): Glyptothorax pedunculatus, a New Species of Sumatran Sisorid Catfish with Slender Caudal Peduncle and Simple Thoracic Adhesive Organ. aqua, International Journal of Ichthyology, 27 (1): 1-4.</ref>
 Glyptothorax platypogon Valenciennes, 1840
 Glyptothorax platypogonides (Bleeker, 1855)
 Glyptothorax plectilis H. H. Ng & Hadiaty, 2008
 Glyptothorax poonaensis Hora, 1938
 Glyptothorax prashadi Mukerji, 1932
 Glyptothorax punjabensis Mirza & Kashmiri, 1971
 Glyptothorax quadriocellatus (Đ. Y. Mai, 1978)
 Glyptothorax radiolus H. H. Ng & Lalramliana, 2013 
 Glyptothorax rugimentum H. H. Ng & Kottelat, 2008
 Glyptothorax rupiri (L. Kosygin, P. Singh & S. Rath, 2021)
 Glyptothorax saisii (J. T. Jenkins, 1910)
 Glyptothorax schmidti (Volz, 1904)
 Glyptothorax scrobiculus H. H. Ng & Lalramliana, 2012 
 Glyptothorax senapatiensis Premananda, Kosygin & Saidullah, 2015 
 Glyptothorax siamensis Hora, 1923
 Glyptothorax silviae Coad, 1981
 Glyptothorax sinensis (Regan, 1908)
 Glyptothorax steindachneri (Pietschmann, 1913)
 Glyptothorax stocki Mirza & Nijssen, 1978
 Glyptothorax stolickai (Steindachner, 1867)
 Glyptothorax strabonis H. H. Ng & Freyhof, 2008
 Glyptothorax striatus (McClelland, 1842)
 Glyptothorax sufii K. Asghar Bashir & Mirza, 1975
 Glyptothorax sykesi (F. Day, 1873)
 Glyptothorax trewavasae Hora, 1938
 Glyptothorax trilineatus Blyth, 1860 (Three-lined catfish)
 Glyptothorax ventrolineatus Vishwanath & Linthoingambi, 2006 
 Glyptothorax verrucosus Rameshori & Vishwanath, 2012 
 Glyptothorax zanaensis X. W. Wu, M. J. He & X. L. Chu, 1981
 Glyptothorax zhujiangensis'' Y. H. Lin, 2003

References

 
Fauna of Turkey
Fish of Asia
Fish of China
Fish of Indonesia
Fish of Southeast Asia
Freshwater fish genera
Catfish genera
Taxa named by Edward Blyth